The Fee Building, is a historic commercial building in Carmel-by-the-Sea, California. It was built and designed in 1935, by master builder Michael J. Murphy as a mixed-use retail shop and residence. It is an example of a Spanish Colonial Revival architecture style building. The structure is recognized as an important commercial building in the city's Downtown Conservation District Historic Property Survey, and was nominated and submitted to the California Register of Historical Resources on February 21, 2003. The building is now occupied by the Coldwell Banker real estate agency and the Belle Cose clothing and jewelry store.

History

The Fee Building was established for owner William P. Fee, in 1935 as a mixed-use retail shop and residence, located on Ocean Avenue and Lincoln Street in Carmel-by-the-Sea, California, next to the Harrison Memorial Library. The construction cost in 1935 was $8,000. It is a two-story wood-frame, concrete, stucco Spanish Colonial-style building with an intersecting Spanish tiled roof. The ground level on Ocean Avenue has an arched entrance and shop windows for a retail business. The upstairs apartment has multi-pane French doors that leads to the living room, and an open terrace with wrought iron railings. There are two chimneys that can be seen from the upstair apartment and copper gutters and downspouts.

M. J. Murphy, Inc. designed and constructed the Fee Building and J. Weaver Kitchen did the original modern plumbing and fixtures that was part of the construction. Jack Belvail & Sons did the lighting and electrical work for the new property. Major W. J. Hairs reopened the Merle's Treasure Chest in 1936, with jewelry and antiques collected from his travels. Another tenant was Joe's Taxi Service, which had a fleet of Packard cars, and Paul's Barber shop.

Several additions and remodeling’s took place over the years. In 1940, the upstairs rear addition was designed by Robert Jones for $750. In 1944, Hugh W. Comstock remodeled the front with glass windows for $242. In 1957, the interior portion was changed by J. B. Pratessa for $4000.

The building qualified for inclusion in the city's Downtown Conservation District Historic Property Survey, and has been nominated and submitted to the California Register of Historical Resources on February 21, 2003. The property is significant under the California Register criterion 3, in the area of architecture as an example of  Spanish Colonial Revival style and designed by master builder Michael J. Murphy. Developer Samuel Finley Brown Morse made use of this style for houses built in Pebble Beach, California, and the style was used in downtown Carmel in the late 1920s and 1930s.

William P. Fee
William Parker Fee (1869-1938) was born on August 3, 1869, from Belfast, Northern Ireland. His father was William P. Fee (1830-1908) and mother was Jeanette Parker (1840-1903). He had a daughter, Doris Parker Fee (1906-1997), and sister Jennie Klink both of Big Sur; and a sister Mima McCormack of Belfast; and a brother, Robert Andres Fee (1869-1941), of New York City. His wife, Mabel Edith Fee (1876-1928), was from Guernsey, England. She died in Carmel on October 28, 1928 at the age of 52.

Parker lived in Carmel for 5 years before moving to the Ripplewood Resort at Big Sur, California. On January 23, 1926, Mary E. Hand, president of the Carmel Arts and Crafts Club, and her husband transferred a real estate deed to Lot 6 and east 25 feet lot 10, Blk. 72 in Carmel to Fee for $10.

Fee died, at age 68, on January 21, 1938, in a Monterey Peninsula hospital. Funeral services were held by the Pacific Grove, California Masonic lodge at the Dormey Funeral Home. Rev. S. C. Potter was the minister at the service. Fee was buried at the El Carmelo Cemetery in Pacific Grove.

See also
List of Historic Buildings in Carmel-by-the-Sea

References

External links

 Downtown Conservation District Historic Property Survey

1935 establishments in California
Carmel-by-the-Sea, California
Buildings and structures in Monterey County, California
Spanish Colonial Revival architecture in California